Amri is an ancient settlement in modern-day Sindh, Pakistan, that goes back to 3600 BCE. The site is located south of Mohenjo Daro on Hyderabad-Dadu Road more than 100 kilometres north of Hyderabad, Pakistan.

Cultural context 

The earliest site of this culture is Kunal (4000 BCE) in Haryana which is older than Rehman Dheri (3300 BCE). The type site, the first excavated site of this type of culture is Kot Diji. Rehman Dheri, which was considered oldest example of this culture, is now the second oldest example of this culture after Kunal was excavated and found to be older than Rehman Dher with similar older cultural artifacts then the Rehman Dheri. 

Kot Diji and Amri are close to each other in Sindh, they earlier developed indigenous culture which had common elements, later they came in contact with Harappan culture and fully developed into Harappan culture. Earliest examples of artifacts belonging to this culture were found at Rehman Dheri, however, later excavations found the oldest example of this culture at Kunal. These are cultural ancestor to site at Harappa. These sites have pre-Harappan indigenous cultural levels, distinct from the culture of Harappa, these are at Banawali (level I), Kot Diji (level 3A), Amri (level II). Rehman Dheri also has a pre Kot Diji phase (RHD1 3300-28 BCE) which are not part of IVC culture. Kot Diji has two later phases that continue into and alongside Mature Harappan Phase (RHDII and RHDII 2500-2100 BCE). Fortified towns found here are dated as follows. 

 Kunal (5000/4000 BCE- ), in Hisar district of Haryana in India is the earliest site found with layers in phase I dating back to 5000 BCE and 4000 BCE, site's culture is an older ancestry of the Pre-Harappan site of Rehman Dheri which was dated to  3300 BC. A button seal was discovered at Kunal during 1998-99 excavations by Archaeological Survey of India. The seal is similar to the Rehman Dheri examples. It contained a picture of two deer on one side, and geometrical pattern on other side. The second phase of Kunal corresponds to  post-neolithic phase of Hakra culture' (also called Early Harappan Phase, c.3300-2800 BCE or c.5000-2800 BCE) was also found.
 Kot Diji (3300 BCE), is the type site, located in Sindh in Pakistan.
 Amri (3600–3300 BCE), also has non-Harappan phases daring 6000 BC to 4000 BC, and later Harappan Phses till 1300 BCE.
 Kalibangan (3500 BC – 2500 BC), in northwest Rajasthan in India on Ghaggar River.
 Rehman Dheri, 3300 BCE, near Dera Ismail Khan and close to River Zhob Valleyin Khyber Pakhtunkhwa in Pakistan.

Archaeology

Prehistoric Amri-Nal culture is attributed to the dual typesites of Amri and Nal.

This site had multi-level structures, although it was never a big city. 

Pre-Harappan stage
Situated near the foothills of Kirthar Mountains, this was an important earlier urban center in Lower Sindh. Amri is close to Balochistan where development of earlier farming communities from 6000 BC to 4000 BC ultimately led to urbanization.

The ancient mounds of 8 hectares on the west bank of Indus River have been extensively excavated. The earliest phase was a fortified town that flourished from 3600 to 3300 BC, and belonged to the Pre-Harappan stage of the Indus Valley civilization. Amri is dated after Rehman Dheri.

The pottery discovered here had its own characteristics and is known as Amri Ware. Sohr Damb (Nal) is a related site in Balochistan to the west of Amri. Their pottery is sometimes collectively described as 'Amri-Nal ware'.

Like other Pre Harappa towns, no writings were found at this site. Evidence indicates widespread fire at the town around 2500 BCE.

Later phases
In period II (ca. 2750-2450 BC), more and more elements of Indus Valley culture appear.

Period III (ca. 2450-1900 BC) belongs almost entirely to Indus Valley culture.

Period IV (ca. 1900-1300 BC) is marked by the mingling of cultural traditions. Elements of the Jhukar culture appear, and co-exist with the last phase of the Indus Valley culture. Later, the elements of Jhangar culture appear.

Period V is Muslim and dated much later.

Based on the evidence from this site, Indus culture was probably not developed directly from Amri culture. Also, at least at this location, rather than suddenly being replaced by the Amri culture, there was a co-existence of both cultures.

See also

 Indus Valley civilization

 List of Indus Valley civilization sites
 Bhirrana, 4 phases of IVC with earliest dated to 8th-7th millennium BCE
 Harappa
 Kalibanga, an IVC town and fort with several phases starting from Early harappan phase
 Kunal, Haryana pre harappan cultural ancestor of Rehman Dheri
 Mohenjo Daro
 Rakhigarhi, one of the largest IVC city with 4 phases of IVC with earliest dated to 8th-7th millennium BCE

 List of inventions and discoveries of the Indus Valley civilization
 Hydraulic engineering of the Indus Valley civilization
 Sanitation of the Indus Valley civilisation

 Periodisation of the Indus Valley civilisation

 Pottery in the Indian subcontinent
 Bara culture, subtype of Late-Harappan Phase
 Black and red ware, belonging to neolithic and Pre-Harappan phases
 Kunal culture, subtype of Pre-Harappan Phase
 Sothi-Siswal culture, subtype of Pre-Harappan Phase
 Cemetery H culture (2000-1400 BC), early Indo-Aryan pottery at IVC sites later evolved into Painted Grey Ware culture of Vedic period

References

External links
 
 Ancient History
 J.M. Casal: Fouilles d’Amri'', Paris 1964

Hyderabad District, Pakistan
Archaeological sites in Sindh
Ghost towns in Pakistan
Indus Valley civilisation sites
Former populated places in Pakistan
Pre-Indus Valley civilisation sites
Amri-Nal culture